Tolba is a surname and place name. Notable people and places with this name include:

Places
Aïn Tolba, a municipality in Algeria
Majmaa Tolba, a commune in Morocco
M'Qam Tolba, a commune in Morocco
Souk Tolba, a commune in Morocco
Staraya Tolba, a village in Russia

People with the surname
Hamada Tolba (born 1981), Egyptian footballer
Islam Tolba (born 1989), Egyptian amateur Greco-Roman wrestler and Olympic competitor
Magdy Tolba (born 1964), Egyptian footballer
Mohamed Ould Tolba (born 1962), Mauritanian politician and teacher
Mostafa Kamal Tolba (1922–2016), Egyptian biologist and civil servant
Marwan Tolba, Palestinian-Canadian emergency medicine physician and activist